Patrolling the Ether is a short film made in 1944 depicting amateur radio operators aiding the Federal Communications Commission in monitoring the airwaves for Nazi spy transmissions. It is notable as the first film ever broadcast simultaneously on more than one television station; on 10 April 1944, it was shown on three stations:  WNBT, New York (now WNBC), WPTZ Philadelphia (now KYW) and WRGB Schenectady, New York, marking a milestone in the history of network television.

The film was directed by Paul Burnford, and starred Emmett Vogan.

References

American World War II propaganda shorts
1944 films
American black-and-white films
American short documentary films
1940s short documentary films
1940s American films